The Good Shepherd is an image in the Christian Bible.

Good Shepherd may also refer to:

Christianity 
 Church of the Good Shepherd (disambiguation)
 Good Shepherd Sunday (disambiguation)
 Third Sunday of Easter, the traditional Good Shepherd Sunday
 Fourth Sunday of Easter, the day to which many Christian denominations assigned the reading after the liturgical reforms of the 1970s
 Good Shepherd Sisters, a Roman Catholic religious order
 Institute of the Good Shepherd, a Roman Catholic society of apostolic life of traditionalist Catholic priests in full communion with the Holy See
 Cathedral of the Good Shepherd, Roman Catholic church in Singapore
 Good Shepherd Cathedral of San Sebastián, Roman Catholic church in Basque Country, Spain
 Good Shepherd Cathedral, Ayr, Roman Catholic church in Scotland
 Chapel of the Good Shepherd (Chautauqua, New York), Episcopal
 Chapel of the Good Shepherd (Roosevelt Island), New York City

Education 
 Good Shepherd (Edmonton), a school district in Canada
 Good Shepherd Lutheran College, a school in Queensland, Australia
 Good Shepherd School, Grahamstown a school in Eastern Cape, South Africa

Arts and entertainment 
 The Good Shepherd (2004 film) or The Confessor, a Canadian film directed by Lewin Webb
 The Good Shepherd (film), a 2006 American film directed by Robert De Niro
 "The Good Shepherd" (Grimm), a television episode
 "Good Shepherd" (Star Trek: Voyager), a television episode
 The Good Shepherd (novel), a 1955 novel by C. S. Forester
 "Good Shepherd" (song), a traditional song best known for a 1969 arrangement and recording by Jefferson Airplane

Other uses 
 Good Shepherd IV, a small ferry connecting Fair Isle to the rest of Shetland in the UK

fr:Bon-Pasteur